Gillespie Airport is a former airport in Nashville, Tennessee.   It was opened in 1941.   During World War II, it was leased to the United States Army Air Forces as a training airfield.

Known USAAF units which trained at Gillespie Field were:
 305th Bombardment Squadron (Dive), 3 Oct 1942-2 Nov 1942
 306th Bombardment Squadron (Dive), 3 Oct 1942-2 Nov 1942
 307th Bombardment Squadron (Dive), 3 Oct 1942-2 Nov 1942
 308th Bombardment Squadron (Dive), 3 Oct 1942-2 Nov 1942

Returned after the war to private ownership, it was later bought by the city of Nashville and was renamed "Cumberland Field".    It was closed in the late 1950s, and the land was redeveloped.    Today the location of the former airfield is now part of the Nashville Metro Center.

See also

 Tennessee World War II Army Airfields

References 

 A Chronology of Nashville Airports

1941 establishments in Tennessee
Airfields of the United States Army Air Forces in Tennessee
Transportation buildings and structures in Nashville, Tennessee
Airports established in 1941